"Cameras follow the RSPCA as they rescue dogs from the worst of circumstances."

The Dog Rescuers, (sometimes known as The Dog Rescuers with Alan Davies)  is a British television programme that followed the work of animal charity RSPCA, specifically their work rescuing dogs.

A total of six series and eight special episodes of the show were broadcast on Channel 5 from 8 October 2013 to 26 December 2019, the show moved to 5Select in 2019 with the first episode of the seventh series airing on 14 October 2019.

The first season of the show was originally narrated by Russel Tovey. From the second season on Alan Davies, the English stand-up comedian, hosted the show. When Alan Davies took over, this is when the show became well-know as, "The Dog Rescuers with Alan Davies". 

Alan Davies describes the show as, "“It’s nice television,” says Alan, 48. “Yes, there are sad stories, but there are some funny ones, too. At the end of the show, we give viewers the opportunity to put themselves forward if they would be keen to rehome any dogs, so hopefully that will have a positive outcome, too.”

The show takes place in different parts of the UK, helping dogs who were neglected, abused, or abandoned. Throughout the documentary the audience will see the insides of a vet clinic and their process they do in order to help the dogs. Some of the types of professionals the audiences see within the documentary are vets, animal control, police officers, and or RSPCA Inspectors.

Transmissions

Series

Specials

The Kitten Rescuers/Jo Brand's Cats & Kittens
On 28 December 2016, Jo Brand presented a one-off episode entitled "The Kitten Rescuers" on Channel 5. In 2017, it was turned into a series renamed as "Jo Brand's Cats & Kittens" it began airing on 14 November 2017 for a six-episode run until 19 December 2017.

The Dog Rescuer | Pets & Vets 
Under the Youtube account, "Pets & Vets" there is a section of "The Dog Rescuer" documentaries with Alan Davie. These are new episodes that are not found on streaming platforms. They consist of the same content as the television series with more recent release dates. The first release date was on 21 December 2022. The latest episode was released on 2 June 2022. The documentary continues to follow RSPCA inspectors as they work to try to help rescue dogs across the UK.

References

External links

Official website
Official Twitter
RSPCA's Official website
RSPCA Donate

2020s British television series
2013 British television series debuts
Channel 5 (British TV channel) original programming
English-language television shows
Television shows about dogs